Café Coffee Day (CCD) is an Indian multinational chain of coffeehouses headquartered in Bengaluru, Karnataka. It is a subsidiary of Coffee Day Enterprises Limited. Internationally, CCDs are present in Austria, Czech Republic, Malaysia, Nepal and Egypt.

History
Café Coffee Day Global Limited Company is a Chikkamagaluru-based business which grows coffee in its own estates of 20,000 acres. It is the largest producer of arabica beans in Asia, exporting to various countries including U.S., Europe, and Japan.

V. G. Siddhartha started the café chain in 1996 when he incorporated Coffee Day Global, which is the parent of the Coffee Day chain. The first CCD outlet was set up on July 11, 1996, at Brigade Road, Bangalore, Karnataka. It rapidly expanded to other cities in India, with more than 1,000 cafés open across the nation by 2011.

In 2010, it was announced that a consortium led by Kohlberg Kravis Roberts would invest  in Coffee Day Resorts, owned by the company. The same year, the logo was changed to the current logo, which the company stated was to showcase the chain as a place to talk. This was done with major changes in the layout of the stores, including the addition of lounges and a total revamp of the interiors.

The company is vertically integrated as per the strategy to cut costs: from owning the plantations to growing the coffee, making the coffee machines and making the furniture for the outlets.

On 29 July 2019, Siddhartha went missing, and his body was found in the Nethravathi river backwaters two days later. A letter, assumed to be written by Siddhartha addressing the board of directors and staff, was made public in which he takes responsibility for not creating a profitable business model.

In September 2019, the company appointed auditing firm Ernst and Young to scrutinize their books of accounts. They also indicated the auditor will also look into circumstances of the last letter written by the founder and the points he made in it.

In March 2020, Coffee Day Enterprises Limited announced that it has reached an agreement to sell Global Village Technology Park, a 90-acre tech park on the outskirts of Bengaluru, for a total consideration of ₹2,700 crore for repaying the debt of Cafe Coffee Day's associate firms and their promoters.

Outlets
As of June 2021, the company had 550 café outlets in different cities of India.

Subsidiaries
In June 2010, CCD acquired Café Emporio, a café chain from the Czech Republic. At that time, Café Emporio had 11 cafés in the Czech Republic.

Café Coffee Day's divisions include:
 Coffee Day Fresh 'n' Ground, which owns 375 coffee bean and powder retail outlets
 Coffee Day Square, a high-level coffee bar in Bangalore, Kolkata, Chennai, Mumbai and New Delhi
 Coffee Day Xpress, which runs 537 Coffee Day kiosks
 Coffee Day Beverages, which runs over 56,799 vending machines
 Coffee Day Exports, its exporting wing
 Coffee Day Perfect, its fast-moving consumer goods packaged coffee division
 Coffee Day B2C Plant, coffee vending machine manufacturing division

See also
 List of coffeehouse chains
 Tata Starbucks

Footnotes

External links
 Official website

Coffeehouses and cafés in India
Coffee brands
Indian brands
Privately held companies of India
Companies listed on the National Stock Exchange of India
Companies listed on the Bombay Stock Exchange